Fumika (written: 史華, 史佳, 史加, 文香, 富美加 or ふみか in hiragana) is a feminine Japanese given name. Notable people with the name include:

, Japanese actress and model
, Japanese volleyball player
, Japanese ice hockey player
, Japanese actress and gravure idol
, Japanese Bharathanatyam dancer.
, Japanese voice actress and gravure idol

Fictional characters
, protagonist of the anime series Shigofumi: Letters from the Departed
, a character from the manga and anime series Negima! Magister Negi Magi
, a character from Strike Witches

Japanese feminine given names